Rowan County is a county in the U.S. state of North Carolina that was formed in 1753, as part of the British Province of North Carolina. It was originally a vast territory with unlimited western boundaries, but its size was reduced to 524 sq mi after several counties were formed from Rowan County in the 18th and 19th centuries. As of the 2020 census, its population was 146,875. Its county seat, Salisbury, is the oldest continuously populated European-American town in the western half of North Carolina. Rowan County is located northeast of Charlotte, and is considered part of the Charlotte metropolitan area.

History

Early history
The first Europeans to enter what is now Rowan County were members of the Spanish expedition of Juan Pardo in 1567. They established a fort and a mission in the native village of Guatari, believed to be located near the Yadkin River and inhabited by the Wateree. At the time, the area was ruled by a female chief whom the Spaniards called Guatari Mico (Mico was the Wateree's term for chief). The Spaniards called the village Salamanca in honor of the city of Salamanca in western Spain, and established a mission, headed by a secular priest named Sebastián Montero.

This fort was one of six that Pardo's expedition established before he returned separately to Spain in 1568. Small garrisons were stationed at each fort. They were built into the interior, including across the mountains in what is now southeastern Tennessee. In 1568, Native Americans at each fort massacred all but one soldier in the garrisons. The Spanish never returned to this interior area in other colonizing attempts, instead concentrating their efforts in Spanish Florida.

18th century
English colonial settlement of North Carolina came decades later, starting in the coastal areas, where settlers migrated south from Virginia. Explorers and fur traders were the first to reach the Piedmont, paving the way for eventual settlers. Rowan County was formed in 1753 from the northern part of Anson County. It was named for Matthew Rowan, acting governor of North Carolina from 1753 to 1754. It was intended to incorporate all of the lands of the Granville District that had previously been included in Anson County.

A house several miles west of present-day Salisbury in "the Irish settlement" served as the first courthouse starting June 15, 1753. Daniel Boone's father Squire Boone served as one of the first magistrates. By mid-1754 a new courthouse site was selected near "the place where the Old Waggon Road (crosses) over Grant's Creek."

As was typical of the time, Rowan County was originally a vast territory with an indefinite western boundary. As the population increased in the region, portions were taken to organize other counties and their seats. In 1770, the eastern portion was combined with the western part of Orange County to form Guilford County. In 1771 the northeastern portion of what was left became Surry County. In 1777 the western part of Rowan County was organized as Burke County.

After the American Revolutionary War, in 1788, the western portion of the now much smaller Rowan County was organized as Iredell County.

19th century
In 1822, Davidson County was formed from an eastern section. Finally, in 1836, that part of Rowan County north of the South Yadkin River became Davie County, and Rowan County took its present form and size.

Since Rowan County was developed for tobacco, cotton cultivation, and mixed farming in the antebellum period, many of the plantation owners and some farmers were dependent on enslaved labor. Cotton and tobacco continued as a commodity crop after the war and into the 20th century. The population of Rowan County was 27.1 percent slaves in 1860.

During and following the Reconstruction era, the state legislature encouraged investment in railways, which had not occurred before. In addition, textile mills were built here and elsewhere in the Piedmont, bringing back cotton processing and manufacturing from centers in New York and New England. Urban populations increased.

20th century
At the turn of the 20th century, after losing to Republican-Populist fusionist candidates, Democrats regained power and passed laws erecting barriers to voter registration to disenfranchise most Blacks. Together with the passage of Jim Crow laws, which suppressed Blacks socially, these measures ended the progress of African Americans in the state, after Republican men had already been serving in Congress. Charles Aycock and Robert Glenn, who were elected as state governors in 1900 and 1904, respectively, ran political campaigns to appeal to Whites. Six lynchings of African Americans were recorded in Rowan County from the late 19th into the early 20th centuries. This was the second-highest total of killings in the state, a number of extrajudicial murders that two other counties also had.<ref>{{cite web|url=https://eji.org/sites/default/files/lynching-in-america-third-edition-summary.pdf|title=Lynching in America, 3rd edition, Supplement: Lynching by County, Montgomery, Alabama: Equal Justice Initiative|year=2017|access-date=2018-06-08|archive-date=2017-10-23|archive-url=https://web.archive.org/web/20171023063004/https://eji.org/sites/default/files/lynching-in-america-third-edition-summary.pdf|url-status=dead}}</ref>

The racial terrorism of lynchings enforced White suppression of African Americans. In 1902, brothers James and Harrison Gillespie, aged 11 and 13, were lynched by a White mob for allegedly killing a young White woman working in a field. In August 1906, six African-American men were arrested as suspects in the murder of a farm family. That evening, a White mob stormed the county jail in Salisbury, freeing all the White prisoners, interrogating the Black ones, and taking out Jack Dillingham, Nease Gillespie, and his son John. The mob hanged the three men from a tree in a field, mutilated and tortured them, and shot them numerous times.

A center of textile manufacturing spanning from the late 19th to the late 20th century, the county has worked to attract new industries, after many textile manufacturing occupations moved offshore to lower wage markets during the late 20th century.

21st century
In 2003, the county held the "250 Fest", celebrating its 250th anniversary.

Geography

The county's eastern border is formed by the Yadkin River. North of Ellis Crossroads, the South Yadkin River meets the Yadkin. The South Yadkin forms the county's northern border with Davie County. The southern border is an east-west line that bisects the city of Kannapolis.

 State and local protected areas/sites 
 Eagle Point Nature Preserve
 Gold Hill Mines Historic Park
 Lake Corriher Wilderness Park
 North Carolina Transportation Museum

 Major water bodies 
 Cold Water Creek (Irish Buffalo Creek tributary)
 Dutch Buffalo Creek
 High Rock Lake
 Irish Buffalo Creek
 Kannapolis Lake
 Lake Corriher
 Lake Fisher
 Lake Wright
 South Yadkin River
 Tuckertown Reservoir
 Yadkin River

Adjacent counties
 Cabarrus County – south
 Davidson County – east
 Davie County – north
 Iredell County – west
 Stanly County – southeast

Major highways

 
 
 
 
 
 
 
 
 
 
 

Interstate 85 passes through the county from southwest to northeast. In the early 2000s, I-85 was widened in the central and northern part of the county, from exit 68, US 29 Connector, north almost to the Davidson County line. A new bridge over the Yadkin River was also built.

U.S. Route 70 enters the northwestern part of Rowan County, west of Cleveland. It runs southeast into Salisbury, where it follows Jake Alexander Boulevard to the southeast and joins US 29 North as Main Street. US 70 continues northeast as Main Street; it is called Salisbury Avenue in Spencer before crossing into Davidson County.

U.S. Route 29 forms Main Street in Kannapolis, China Grove, and Landis in the southern part of the county. It joins US 70 as Main Street through Salisbury, and as Salisbury Avenue in Spencer.

U.S. Route 52 is the main artery for the southeastern part of the county, serving the towns of Gold Hill, Rockwell, and Granite Quarry. Just before reaching downtown Salisbury, US-52 joins Interstate 85, which it follows into Davidson county.

 Major infrastructure 
 Mid-Carolina Regional Airport, near Salisbury.
 Salisbury Station

Demographics

2020 census

As of the 2020 United States census, there were 146,875 people, 55,241 households, and 37,900 families residing in the county.

2010 census
As of the census of 2010, there were 138,428 people, 53,140 households, and 37,058 families residing in the county. The population density was 270.7 people per square mile (98/km2). There were 60,211 housing units at an average density of 117.7 per square mile (41/km2).  The racial makeup of the county was 76.52% White, 16.18% Black or African American, 0.34% Native American, 1.00% Asian, 0.035% Pacific Islander, 4.33% from other races, and 1.60% from two or more races. 7.69% of the population were Hispanic or Latino of any race.

Of the 53,140 households, 29.30% had children under the age of 18 living with them, 50.20% were married couples living together, 8.49% had a female householder with no husband present, 5.41% had a male householder with no wife and 30.26% were non-families. 25.22% of all households were made up of individuals, and 10.15% had someone living alone who was 65 years of age or older.  The average household size was 2.52 and the average family size was 3.00.

In the county, the population was spread out, with 23.80% under the age of 18, 9.00% from 18 to 24, 25.40% from 25 to 44, 27.40% from 45 to 64, and 14.40% who were 65 years of age or older. The median age was 39.1 years. For every 100 females, there were 97.57 males. For every 100 females age 18 and over, there were 95.28 males.

According to the 2000 Census, The median income for a household in the county was $37,494, and the median income for a family was $44,242. Males had a median income of $31,626 versus $23,437 for females. The per capita income for the county was $18,071. About 8.10% of families and 10.60% of the population were below the poverty line, including 13.70% of those under age 18 and 11.40% of those age 65 or over.

Law, government, and politics
The primary governing body of Rowan County is a council–manager government. The five-member Board of Commissioners are elected from single-member districts. As a group, they hire the County Manager, who is responsible for operations. The current County Manager is Aaron Church. The current Commissioners are Greg Edds (Chairman), Jim Greene (Vice-Chairman), Judy Klusman, Mike Caskey, and Craig Pierce. Commissioners are elected to four-year terms, with three being elected during midterm national elections, and two being elected during presidential election years. The commission passes the Code of Ordinances for the county.

Rowan County is a member of the regional Centralina Council of Governments.

In the U.S. Senate, the county is represented by Richard Burr and Thom Tillis.

County commission prayer
In 2013 the American Civil Liberties Union filed suit on behalf of three Rowan county residents against the county commission's practice of starting their meeting with sectarian prayers by the commissioners, who instructed attendees to stand and join in.  A federal district court issued an injunction forbidding the county commissioners from praying at their meetings. After a divided panel of the United States Court of Appeals for the Fourth Circuit found that the prayers did not violate the Establishment Clause of the United States Constitution, the full court sitting en banc disagreed and affirmed the injunction. The Supreme Court of the United States declined to review, over the written dissent of two justices. In 2019, the county was forced to pay $285,000 to the ACLU for the plaintiffs' legal fees because it had lost the lawsuit.

Law enforcement
The Rowan County Sheriff's Office was founded in 1753 when Rowan County was created from Anson County. Its duties include courthouse security, civil process, operation of detention facility, investigations and community patrol. It has over 200 employees, most of which are sworn deputies. The current Sheriff of Rowan County is Kevin L. Auten, who was appointed after the retirement of George Wilhelm in 2009. Auten won election to a full term in his own right in 2010.

The Rowan County Sheriff's Office won the J. Stannard Baker Award, a national award for outstanding achievement in highway safety, in 2003.

1753–1754  Unknown
1754–1758  David Jones
1758–1759  Edward Hughes
1759–1763  Benjamin Miller (Milner)
1763–1764  William Nassery
1764–1767  Francis Locke
1767–1768  Griffith Rutherford
1768–1769  Andrew Allison
1769–1769  Adam Allison (August 11 – November 16)
1770–1770  No Sheriff
1771–1771  William Temple Coles
1771–1772  James McKay
1772–1774  Daniel Little, Esq.
1774–1777  James Kerr
1777–1779  Galbraith Falls
1779–1779  George Henry Berger (February 2, 1779May 5, 1779)
1779–1779  Samuel Hughey (May 6 – November 3)
1779–1780  Josiah Rounsevall, Esq. (November 3 – May 3)
1780–1780  Moses Winslow, Esq. (May 3 – August 9)
1780–1781  William Brandon, Esq. (August 9 – May 9)
1781–1781  Peter Faust (May 9 – August 7)
1781–1782  James Craige
1782–1785  John Brevard Jr.
1785–1786  John Brevard Sr.
1786–1787  Hugh Terrence (Torrence, Torrance, Tarrants)
1787–1790  Lewis Beard
1790–1792  Isaac Jones
1792–1794  John Braly (Brawley) Jr.
1794–1808  John Troy
1808–1813  Edward Chambers
1813–1814  John Smith, Esq.
1814–1818  Alexander Frohock
1818–1820  John Beard, Esq.
1820–1824  Samuel Jones
1824–1826  Charles Fisher
1826–1828  Isaac D. Jones
1828–1837  Fielding Slater
1837–1841  John H. Hardie
1841–1849  Richard W. Long
1849–1858  Caleb Kluttz
1858–1865  W. A. Walton
1865–1866  Solomon Kluttz
1867–1872  W. A. Walton
1872–1880  C. F. Waggoner
1880–1890  Charles C. Krider
1890–1900  J. M. Monroe
1900–1906  D. R. Julian
1906–1908  Hodge Krider (father of J. H. Krider)
1908–1914  J. H. McKenzie
1914–1928  J. H. Krider
1928–1930  R. P. Lyerly
1930–1931  W. Locke McKenzie
1931–1932  Cal Miller
1932–1950  J. H. Krider
1950–1966  Arthur J. Shuping
1966–1986  John Stirewalt
1986–1986  Junius L. Bost (February – December)
1986–1998  Robert G. Martin
1998–2009  George A. Wilhelm
2010–pres.  Kevin L. Auten (served as acting head while chief deputy from the time former sheriff Wilhelm resigned until Auten was appointed as sheriff in 2010)

Education
Colleges
 Catawba College, founded in 1851
 Livingstone College, founded in 1879
 Rowan-Cabarrus Community College. (Otherwise known as RCCC), founded in 1963
 Hood Theological Seminary, founded in 1885, became independent in 2001
 Campbell University, teaching hospital at Novant Health, Rowan Medical Center, started in 2014

Rowan–Salisbury School System

The Rowan–Salisbury School System is a PK-12 graded school district covering nearly all of Rowan County. The 35 schools in the district serve 20,887 students as of 2009–2010. It was formed in 1989 with the merger of Rowan County Schools and Salisbury City Schools.

Kannapolis City Schools

Students living in the portion of Kannapolis located in Rowan County (the city is mostly in Cabarrus County) attend Kannapolis city schools. Their public school system operates independently of the countywide school systems.

Private schools
 North Hills Christian School – (pre-school through high school)
 Rockwell Christian School (pre-school through high school)
 Sacred Heart Catholic School – (elementary through middle school)
 Salisbury Academy – (pre-kindergarten through middle school)
 Salisbury Adventist School

Libraries
 Rowan Public Library
 Headquarters (Salisbury)
 East Branch (Rockwell)
 Frank T. Tadlock South Rowan Regional Library (China Grove)
 West Branch (Cleveland)

Media
The Salisbury Post, founded in 1905, is a local newspaper that is published several days a week.

Communities

Cities
 Kannapolis (portions in Cabarrus County, incorporated in 1984)
 Salisbury (county seat and largest city. Founded in 1753; first post master George Lauman, June 12, 1792)

Towns

 China Grove (post office first established on November 27, 1823, with Noah Partee as postmaster; also called Luthersville in 1846–1849 and Eufaula 1855–1859)
 Cleveland (first postmaster William A. Allison, March 3, 1887; was Third Creek 1884–1887, postmaster William L. Allison; was Rowan Mills 1856–1884, was Cowansville 1831–1856, first postmaster John Cowan)
 East Spencer (first postmaster William J. Hatley, February 12, 1913)
 Faith (first postmaster John W. Frick, January 24, 1889, to July 16, 1906)
 Granite Quarry (founded in the 1800s; originally called Woodsides, first postmaster was John F. Wiley, August 7, 1891, to January 14, 1902; first postmaster was William S. Brown, January 15, 1902)
 Landis (first postmaster was Joel Corriher, July 17, 1902)
 Rockwell (first postmaster was Peter Miller, March 1, 1872)
 Spencer (founded in 1896, first postmaster Hugh Smith, July 15, 1897)

Census-designated place
 Enochville (chartered town from 1874 to 1977)

Unincorporated communities
 Bear Poplar (post office from September 12, 1878, to February 11, 1966, Lucy J. Kistler first postmaster)
 Bostian Heights (formerly Bostians, Post office: August 6, 1875, to July 16, 1877, Sophia L. Bostian as first postmaster)
 Crescent (post office from March 5, 1898, to May 29, 1925, J.M.L. Lyerly first postmaster
 Dogwood Acres
 Dukeville
 Gold Hill (post office established on May 15, 1844, Robert E. Rives first postmaster)
 Liberty
 Mill Bridge (post office from July 23, 1874, to September 30, 1903, Mary E. McCublin first postmaster)
 Mount Ulla (formerly Wood Grove, post office from April 12, 1830, to April 22, 1843, first postmaster Julius J. Reeves; Mount Ulla post office from April 22, 1843, to October 24, 1899, first postmaster James Cowan, post office re-established on November 22, 1899)
 Woodleaf (first postmaster was Daniel Wood, September 4, 1855)

Townships
By the requirements of the North Carolina Constitution of 1868, the county was divided into townships. Previous to that time, the subdivisions were Captain's Districts. While the Captain's Districts referred primarily to the militia, it served also for the election precinct, the tax listing and tax collecting district. The following townships in Rowan County were created in 1868:

 Atwell
 China Grove
 Cleveland
 Franklin
 Gold Hill
 Litaker
 Locke
 Morgan
 Mount Ulla
 Providence
 Salisbury
 Scotch Irish
 Steele
 Unity

Notable people
County-wide notables include the following:
 Tommy Barnhardt (1963 ), NFL player, played at UNC
 William Lee Davidson (17461781), Revolutionary War Colonel
 Joseph Dickson (17451825), Revolutionary War Colonel and Congressman
 Governor of North Carolina John W. Ellis (18201861), born in what was then eastern Rowan County and practiced law in Salisbury.
 Jackie Fargo (19302013), professional wrestler
 Former North Carolina Commissioner of Agriculture James Allen Graham was born and raised in Cleveland.
 Phil Kirk, former chairman of the North Carolina State Board of Education, is a Rowan native.
 Francis Locke (17221796), plantation owner in Rowan, noted for his victory at the Battle of Ramseur's Mill during the American Revolutionary War
 Congressman Francis Locke, Jr. (17661823), born in Rowan County
 Matthew Locke (17301801), Congressman and Brigadier General in the American Revolution
 W. Eugene McCombs (19252004), North Carolina assemblyman and Rowan County Commissioner
 U.S. Senator Lee Slater Overman (18541930)
 Joseph Pearson (17761834), Congressman
 Griffith Rutherford (17211805), military officer and Revolutionary War general, commander of the Salisbury District Brigade
For a full list of notables from Rowan County and places within the county, see :Category:People from Rowan County, North Carolina.

See also
 List of counties in North Carolina
 National Register of Historic Places listings in Rowan County, North Carolina
 Rowan County Regiment, North Carolina militia
 Rowan County Sheriff's Office
 Carter County, Tennessee

References

Further reading
 Clegg, Claude A., III. Troubled Ground: A Tale of Murder, Lynching, and Reckoning in the New South (Urbana: University of Illinois Press, 2010).
 Gehrke, William H. "The Beginnings of the Pennsylvania-German Element in Rowan and Cabarrus Counties, North Carolina." Pennsylvania Magazine of History and Biography 58.4 (1934): 342–369. online
 Rumple, Jethro. A History of Rowan County, North Carolina'' (Heritage Books, 2009).  This publication does not include all lynchings, only those of black skin or those of known African heritage.

External links

 
 
 Visit Salisbury-Rowan County - convention & Visitors Bureau website.
 Rowan Public Library
 Rowan Museum
 NCGenWeb Rowan County – free genealogy resources for the county
 Salisbury Post

 
1753 establishments in North Carolina
Populated places established in 1753
Charlotte metropolitan area